John Gossage (born 1946) is an American photographer, noted for his artist's books and other publications using his photographs to explore under-recognised elements of the urban environment such as abandoned tracts of land, debris and garbage, and graffiti, and themes of surveillance, memory and the relationship between architecture and power.

Life and career
Gossage was born in Staten Island, New York City in 1946 and at an early age became interested in photography, leaving school at 16 and taking private instruction from Lisette Model, Alexey Brodovitch and Bruce Davidson. He later moved to Washington, D.C. to study, and subsequently received a grant from the Washington Gallery of Modern Art which allowed him to remain in the city and refine his photographic technique. He has shown his photographs in solo and group exhibitions since 1963.

After a number of years with Nazraeli Press his usual publisher is now Loosestrife Editions and Steidl.

In 2010, Steidl published Gossage's The Thirty-Two Inch Ruler / The Map of Babylon, two companion volumes bound together that feature his first ever published photographs in color. The Thirty-Two Inch Ruler features a neighborhood in which he lives, populated by ambassadorial residences, embassies and the lavish private homes of those who are in positions of power and influence in Washington, D.C., and was prompted by the arrival of a new neighbor, then-Secretary of Defense Donald Rumsfeld. Over the same year, Gossage took photographs abroad, including in Germany and China, which are published in Map of Babylon.

He has taught at the University of Maryland, College Park and curated several photographic exhibitions. He lives and works in Washington, D.C.

Publications

Publications by Gossage
Gardens. Hollow Press; Castelli Graphic, 1978. . Text selected by Walter Hopps.
The Pond.
New York: Aperture, 1985. . With an essay by Denise Sines. Edition of 2000 copies.
New York: Aperture, 2010. . With a preface by Toby Jurovics and an essay by Gerry Badger.
Stadt des Schwarz. Loosestrife, 1987.
LAMF: Three Days in Berlin 1987. Self-published, 1988.
There and Gone. Nazraeli, 1997.
The Things that Animals Care About. Tucson, AZ: Nazraeli, 1998.
Empire. Nazraeli, 2000.
Four American Photographs. Nazraeli, 2000. One Picture Book 2. .
Hey Fuckface!. Tucson, AZ: Nazraeli, 2000. . With a pamphlet by Gus Blaisdell containing an essay taken from "Obscenity in Thy Mothers Milk," and a single page interview of Gossage by Peter Lloyd. Edition of 100 copies. "19 original silver gelatin prints with hand written curses mounted on rag board, housed in a wood and plexiglass box by Yachio-shi." A study of Environmental Protection Agency-listed hazardous waste sites in and near Staten Island and Syracuse, New York.
Romance Industry. Nazraeli, 2002.
Dance Card Vol. 2. One Star Press, 2003.
Berlin in the Time of the Wall. 2004. Images taken during more than twenty years of study of Berlin.
Putting Back the Wall. Loosestrife, 2007. .
13 Ways to Miss a Train. Linea di Confine, 2004.
Secret of Real Estate. Sheldon Art Galleries, 2008.
The Absolute Truth. Tokyo: Super Labo, 2011. Edition of 500 copies.
Eva’s Book. Tokyo: Super Labo, 2011. . Edition of 500 copies.
Here. Rochester Art Center, 2010.
A Few Years With a Telecaster. Harper’s books, 2010.
The Thirty Two Inch Ruler: Map of Babylon. Göttingen: Steidl, 2010. .
Waking in Warhol’s Bed. Kehrer, 2010.
The Auckland Project. Radius, 2011.
The Actor. Loosestrife, 2012.
She Called me by Name. Loosestrife, 2012.
The Code. Harper’s Books 2012.
Pomodori a Grappolo. Radius, 2014.
Who Do You Love. Fraenkel Gallery, 2014.
Nothing. Waltz Books, 2015.
Hey Fuckface (bootleg). Horses Think Press, 2015. With texts by Gus Blaisdell and Peter Lloyd.
A Dozen Failures. TIS (This Is Sausage), 2016. . Edition of 700 copies.
Looking up Ben James: A Fable. Göttingen: Steidl, 2016. .
Jack Wilson's Waltz. Göttingen: Steidl, 2019. .
Should Nature Change. Göttingen: Steidl, 2019.
The Nicknames of Citizens. Göttingen: Steidl, 2020.

Publications with others
America, 2006. Photographs by Obvious & Ordinary. Chicago: Stephen Daiter Gallery; London: Rocket Gallery, 2007. By Martin Parr ("Obvious") and Gossage ("Ordinary"). Edition of 1500 copies.
One Day: 10 Photographers. Heidelberg: Kehrer, 2011. . A boxed set of ten books of photographs taken on 21 June 2010. Edited by Harvey Benge, each book by one of Gossage, Alec Soth, Jessica Backhaus, Gerry Badger, Benge, Todd Hido, Rob Hornstra, Rinko Kawauchi, Eva Maria Ocherbauer and Martin Parr.
Snake Eyes. Washington D.C.: Loosestrife, 2002. With Terri Weifenbach. Edition of 500 copies.
 The Auckland Project. Santa Fe, NM: Radius, 2011. . Photographs by Gossage and Alec Soth. Two volume hardbound in slipcase.

Exhibitions
John Gossage: The Pond, Smithsonian American Art Museum, Washington, D.C., 2010/2011
The Thirty Two Inch Ruler: Map of Babylon, World Photography Festival and Sony World Photography Awards Exhibitions, World Photography Organisation, Somerset House, London, 2011.

Collections
Gossage's work is held in the following public and private permanent collections:
Museum of Modern Art, New York
Corcoran Gallery of Art, Washington, DC
Art Institute of Chicago, Chicago, IL
Canadian Centre for Architecture, Montreal
Menil Collection, Houston

References

External links
A conversation between Gossage and Tim Carpenter (audio) and a transcript of that conversation, 'A Walking Conversation with John Gossage', published in Spot magazine

1946 births
Living people
American photographers
Artists from New York City
People from Staten Island
Photography academics
Photography curators
University of Maryland, College Park faculty